"Say You Love Me" is a song by British singer Jessie Ware from her second studio album, Tough Love (2014). The song was released in the United Kingdom as a digital download on 28 September 2014 as the second single from the album. The song was written by Ware, Ed Sheeran, Benny Blanco and Ben Ash. Sheeran also provided uncredited vocals for the track.

Music video
The official music video for the song was released on 11 September 2014 in Ware's YouTube account and was directed by collective Tell No One. The video features Ware with a black dress, barefoot and sitting on a rock with a tropical background and leaves on the floor. As the video goes, the lights turn off focusing on Ware. The video has over 128 million views, making it her most watched video.

Track listings

Charts

Certifications

Release history

References

2014 singles
2014 songs
Jessie Ware songs
Island Records singles
Pop ballads
Contemporary R&B ballads
Songs written by Ed Sheeran
Songs written by Benny Blanco
Songs written by Jessie Ware
Songs written by Two Inch Punch
2010s ballads